Neill–Turner–Lester House, also known as Five Oaks and the Neill-Lester House, is a historic home located near Sherrills Ford, Catawba County, North Carolina. It was built about 1820, and is a two-story, frame dwelling. It was remodeled and enlarged in 1889 in the Italianate style.  The interior retains Federal style design elements from its original construction.

It was listed on the National Register of Historic Places in 1990.

References

Houses on the National Register of Historic Places in North Carolina
Houses completed in 1820
Federal architecture in North Carolina
Italianate architecture in North Carolina
Houses in Catawba County, North Carolina
National Register of Historic Places in Catawba County, North Carolina